Hallarum  is a village in Karlskrona Municipality, Blekinge County, southeastern Sweden. It overlooks Hallarum Bay.

Populated places in Karlskrona Municipality